Chicago Croatian was an American Soccer Club based in Chicago, Illinois.
The club competed professionally in the Lamar Hunt US Open Cup (National Challenge Cup), the CONCACAF Champions League (CONCACAF Champions Cup) and the National Soccer League (Chicago). All their home matches were played in Hanson Stadium and Winemac Stadium in Chicago.

The club was founded in the 1950s and is historically the most successful Croatian soccer club in the USA. The height of the Croatians success came in the 1970s and 1980s, when the team reached the final of the prestigious Lamar Hunt US Open Cup (National Challenge Cup) in 1974, 1979 and 1984. They qualified for the CONCACAF Champions League in 1975 and 1980 but withdrew from the competition. They participated in the  
1985 CONCACAF Champions League (CONCACAF Champions Cup) and were knocked out of the competition in the 1st round by Honduras champions Club Deportivo Olimpia. Both legs of the match where played in Honduras: the 1st leg was played in San Pedro Sula and the 2nd leg in Tegucigalpa; the attendance was over 40,000 spectators for each match.

Honors
Lamar Hunt US Open Cup (National Challenge Cup)
Finalists (3): 1974,1979,1984
Semi-finalist : 1985
National Soccer League (Chicago)
Champions (2):1971,1973 : No records kept 1974 thru 1986
Peel Cup Illinois State Cup
Champions (4): 1973,1976,1978,1986
Croatian-North American Soccer Tournament
Champions (6): 1968,1975,1976,1977,1979,1986
CONCACAF Champions League (CONCACAF Champions Cup) : Participated in 1985 (Also qualified 1975,1980, but withdrew from competition)
 1985 1st round Honduras Central America

Lamar Hunt US Open Cup Results
 June 2, 1974 New York Greek American 2  Chicago Croatian 0
 June 17, 1979 Brooklyn Dodgers 2 Chicago Croatian 1
 June 24, 1984 New York Crete 4 Chicago Croatian 2

CONCACAF Champions League (CONCACAF Champions Cup) 1985

Roster

Managers
Joe Tadijanovic
Frank Basan

References

Croatian-American culture in Illinois
Soccer clubs in Chicago
National Soccer League (Chicago) teams
U.S. clubs in CONCACAF Champions' Cup
Association football clubs established in 1949
Association football clubs disestablished in 1990